Dzmitry Vasilevich Rekish (born 14 September 1988) is a Belarusian professional footballer who plays for as a midfielder for Telavi.

Career

Club
Born in Babruysk, Rekish began playing football in FC Dinamo Minsk's youth system. He played for RUOR Minsk in the Second Division before joining Dinamo's senior team where he made his Belarusian Premier League debut in 2006.

In February 2011, he was loaned to Polonia Warsaw on a half year deal.

International
He is a part of Belarus national under-21 football team. Rekish was a member of the Belarus U21 that finished in 3rd place at the 2011 UEFA European Under-21 Football Championship. He appeared as a substitute in four of the matches.

References

External links

1988 births
Living people
People from Babruysk
Sportspeople from Mogilev Region
Belarusian footballers
Association football midfielders
Belarusian expatriate footballers
FC RUOR Minsk players
FC Dinamo Minsk players
FC Savit Mogilev players
Polonia Warsaw players
FC Neman Grodno players
FK Fotbal Třinec players
FK Kauno Žalgiris players
FK Riteriai players
FC Torpedo-BelAZ Zhodino players
FC Fakel Voronezh players
PS TIRA players
FC Isloch Minsk Raion players
FC Belshina Bobruisk players
FC Torpedo Kutaisi players
FC Samtredia players
FC Telavi players
A Lyga players
Czech National Football League players
Belarusian Premier League players
Russian First League players
Erovnuli Liga players
Liga 1 (Indonesia) players
Expatriate footballers in Poland
Expatriate footballers in the Czech Republic
Expatriate footballers in Lithuania
Expatriate footballers in Russia
Expatriate footballers in Indonesia
Expatriate footballers in Georgia (country)
Belarusian expatriate sportspeople in Poland
Belarusian expatriate sportspeople in the Czech Republic
Belarusian expatriate sportspeople in Lithuania
Belarusian expatriate sportspeople in Russia